Atrichocera is a genus of beetles in the family Cerambycidae, containing the following species:

 Atrichocera celebensis Breuning, 1943
 Atrichocera laosensis Breuning, 1963
 Atrichocera moultoni Aurivillius, 1911

References

Apomecynini
Cerambycidae genera